Karılar Koğuşu is a 1990 Turkish drama film, directed by Halit Refiğ and starring Irem Altug, Kadir Inanir, and Hülya Koçyigit.

References

External links
Karılar Koğuşu at the Internet Movie Database

1990 films
Turkish drama films
1990 drama films
Films directed by Halit Refiğ
1990s prison films